Ahmad Wal is a town in the Pakistani province of Balochistan about 20 miles from the Afghan border. Taliban leader Mullah Akhtar Mansour was killed in a convoy southwest of the town by a U.S. drone strike on May 21, 2016.

References

Populated places in Nushki District